Wilhelm, Duke of Saxe-Weimar (Altenburg, 11 April 1598 – Weimar, 17 May 1662), was a duke of Saxe-Weimar.

Wilhelm was the fifth (but third surviving) son of Johann, Duke of Saxe-Weimar, and Dorothea Maria of Anhalt. He was brother to Bernard of Saxe-Weimar, a successful Protestant general in the Thirty Years' War, and to Ernest I, Duke of Saxe-Gotha (later Altenburg), a successful and well regarded ruler known as "The Pious".

Youth
Like his brothers Johann Ernst and Friedrich, Wilhelm studied at the University of Jena. Later, he accompanied his brothers in their studies abroad. Their educational tour began at the end of August 1613; the brothers visited France, Great Britain and the Netherlands before returning home in 1614.

Some years later, on 24 August 1617, during his mother's funeral, Wilhelm helped found the Fruitbearing Society. In 1651 he became the second head of the society.

Reign
In 1620 Wilhelm became regent of all the estates of his older brother, Johann Ernst, after the latter was subject to the ban of the Empire for refusing to submit to the emperor. When Johann Ernst died in 1626, Wilhelm assumed the title duke of Saxe-Weimar.

One year later, Wilhelm was created a member of the Order of the Stability. During the years 1622-1623, he created a patriotic federation, the German Friedbund, for the promotion of the German states and religious liberties. Wilhelm's maternal uncle, Louis I of Anhalt-Köthen, provided the Friedbund with a generous endowment.

Rise to power
Wilhelm allied himself with his brothers in the Thirty Years' War, serving under Ernst von Mansfeld and Georg Friedrich, Margrave of Baden-Durlach. Later he was promoted under the service of Christian the Younger of Brunswick.

During the division of the paternal states in 1640, Wilhelm retained Weimar and Jena, and his younger brother Albrecht received Eisenach. When Albrecht died childless in 1644, Wilhelm assumed control of the entire inheritance.

King Gustavus Adolphus of Sweden was responsible for Wilhelm's quick rise through the ranks of the military. After Gustav II Adolf's death however, Count Axel Oxenstierna successfully prevented Wilhelm from assuming another command as lieutenant general, and Wilhelm acceded to the Peace of Prague in 1635.

When Prince Louis I of Anhalt-Köthen died on 7 January 1650, the members of the Fruitbearing Society decided that Wilhelm should become his uncle's successor as head of the society. After the obligatory mourning period, Wilhelm became the new head of the society on 8 May 1651, a position that he retained to the end of his life. In contrast to his predecessor, however, he was essentially limited to representative tasks.

Marriage and children
In Weimar on 23 May 1625, Wilhelm married Eleonore Dorothea, daughter of John George I, Prince of Anhalt-Dessau. They had nine children:
 Wilhelm (b. Weimar, 26 March 1626 - d. Weimar, 1 November 1626).
 Johann Ernst II, Duke of Saxe-Weimar (b. Weimar, 11 September 1627 - d. Weimar, 15 May 1683).
 Johann Wilhelm (b. Weimar, 16 August 1630 - d. Weimar, 16 May 1639). 
 Adolf Wilhelm, Duke of Saxe-Eisenach (b. Weimar, 14 May 1632 - d. Eisenach, 22 November 1668).
 Johann Georg I, Duke of Saxe-Marksuhl, later of Saxe-Eisenach (b. Weimar, 12 July 1634 - d. on hunt accident, Eckhartshausen, 19 September 1686). Grandfather of Caroline of Brandenburg-Ansbach, Queen Consort of George II of Great Britain.
 Wilhelmine Eleonore (b. Weimar, 7 June 1636 - d. Weimar, 1 April 1653).
 Bernhard II, Duke of Saxe-Jena (b. Weimar, 14 October 1638 - d. Jena, 3 May 1678).
 Frederick (b. Weimar, 19 March 1640 - d. Weimar, 19 August 1656).
 Dorothea Marie (b. Weimar, 14 October 1641 - d. Moritzburg, 11 June 1675), married on 3 July 1656 to Maurice, Duke of Saxe-Zeitz.

Legacy
Wilhelm wrote the words for the hymn Herr Jesu Christ, dich zu uns wend in 1648. The hymn was sung on Sundays in Thüringen after the priest had entered the pulpit to give his sermon. With a melody that dates back to 1628, it has entered modern German hymnody. In Weimar Johann Sebastian Bach and his cousin Johann Gottfried Walther, the organists at the Schloss and the Stadtkirche, both composed several settings of the hymn, as chorale preludes and chorale variations. Among the five settings by Bach are BWV 632, from the Orgelbüchlein, and BWV 655a, which became part of the Great Eighteen Chorale Preludes.

Wilhelm is portrayed positively as a figure in the fictional 1632 series, also known as the 1632-verse or Ring of Fire series, an alternate history book series, created, primarily co-written, and coordinated by historian Eric Flint.

References

Bibliography 
 Frank Boblenz: Zum Einfluß Wilhelms IV. von Sachsen-Weimar (1598–1662) auf die Entwicklung der Architektur in Thüringen. In: Residenzkultur in Thüringen vom 16. bis 19. Jahrhundert (PALMBAUM Texte: Kulturgeschichte; 8). Bucha bei Jena 1999, S. 114–137.
 Frank Boblenz: Ein Totenbildnis von Herzog Wilhelm IV. von Sachsen-Weimar (1598–1662) im schwedischen Schloss Skokloster. In: Weimar-Jena. Die große Stadt. Das kulturhistorische Archiv 5 (2012) H. 3, S. 220–227. 
Georg Philipp Harsdörffer: Fortpflantzung der hochlöblichen Fruchtbringenden Geselschaft: Das ist / Kurtze Erzehlung alles dessen / Was sich bey Erwehlung und Antrettung hochbesagter Geselschaft Oberhauptes / Deß ... Schmackhaften / ... zugetragen. Samt Etlichen Glückwünschungen / und Einer Lobrede deß Geschmackes. Endter, Nürnberg 1651 (Digitalizado)
 Gustav Lämmerhirt: Wilhelm (Herzog von Sachsen-Weimar). In: Allgemeine Deutsche Biographie (ADB). Band 43, Duncker & Humblot, Leipzig 1898, S. 180–195.

|-

|-

Dukes of Saxe-Weimar
House of Wettin
Military of Saxony
People from Altenburg
People from Saxe-Weimar
1598 births
1662 deaths
Military personnel of the Thirty Years' War